In mathematics, the trigamma function, denoted  or , is the second of the polygamma functions, and is defined by

 .

It follows from this definition that

 

where  is the digamma function. It may also be defined as the sum of the series

 

making it a special case of the Hurwitz zeta function

 

Note that the last two formulas are valid when  is not a natural number.

Calculation

A double integral representation, as an alternative to the ones given above, may be derived from the series representation:

 

using the formula for the sum of a geometric series. Integration over  yields:

 

An asymptotic expansion as a Laurent series is

 

if we have chosen , i.e. the Bernoulli numbers of the second kind.

Recurrence and reflection formulae

The trigamma function satisfies the recurrence relation

 

and the reflection formula

 

which immediately gives the value for z  : .

Special values

At positive half integer values we have that

Moreover, the trigamma function has the following special values:

 

where  represents Catalan's constant.

Relation to the Clausen function

The digamma function at rational arguments can be expressed in terms of trigonometric functions and logarithm by the digamma theorem. A similar result holds for the trigamma function but the circular functions are replaced by Clausen's function. Namely,

Computation and approximation
An easy method to approximate the trigamma function is to take the derivative  of the asymptotic expansion of the digamma function.

Appearance

The trigamma function appears in this sum formula:

See also
 Gamma function
 Digamma function
 Polygamma function
 Catalan's constant

Notes

References
 Milton Abramowitz and Irene A. Stegun, Handbook of Mathematical Functions, (1964) Dover Publications, New York. .  See section §6.4
 Eric W. Weisstein. Trigamma Function -- from MathWorld--A Wolfram Web Resource

Gamma and related functions